Windows RSS Platform, included in Internet Explorer 7 and later and Windows Vista and later is a platform that exposes feed handling and management to Windows applications. The RSS support in Internet Explorer is built on the Windows RSS Platform.

Overview
Windows RSS Platform consists of three components:
Common RSS Data Store - The data store for all feeds managed by the RSS Platform. The RSS Platform API exposes these feeds after sanitizing, that is stripping it of scripts, embedded objects and other potentially malicious content. Access to unformatted XML for the feeds is also allowed.
Common RSS Sync Engine - The sync engine is responsible for downloading the content at periodic intervals. By default, it does not download feed enclosures, which are objects attached to the feed; however this behavior is user configurable. However, it uses Attachment Execute Services to prevent automatic downloading of potentially malicious file types. It uses Windows' scheduled tasks for scheduling and Background Intelligent Transfer Service for background downloading. In order to prevent the web server from being flooded on large number of feed downloads, it also adds slight random delay between requests.
Common RSS Feed List - The list of feeds subscribed to is exposed by the RSS Platform APIs. All RSS clients, including Internet Explorer 7 and Microsoft Outlook 2007, share the list. All modifications thus are reflected across all the RSS readers.

Apps which use the RSS Store
 Internet Explorer 7 and later
 Microsoft Outlook 2007 and later
 All versions of Windows Live Mail

Limitations
 Windows RSS Platform does not support feeds that reference a DTD.
 Although feed reading view can be disabled, custom stylesheets cannot be applied to feeds in Internet Explorer. Internet Explorer uses an internal stylesheet for feed reading view.
 Prior to IE8, the RSS platform did not support authentication/storing credentials.
 The RSS Platform object model does not expose all XML elements and attributes.
 No support for the feed URI scheme and Media RSS.
 The Windows RSS Platform normalizes all feed formats to RSS 2.0.
 Local file system and network feeds are not supported.
 Permanently downloading and saving content downloaded through the feed such as a podcast to a user folder is not supported. Downloaded content is only stored in the Internet Explorer Temporary Internet Files cache.

See also
Internet Explorer 7
Microsoft Outlook 2007

References

External links
 Microsoft Team RSS blog
 Windows RSS Platform
 RSS Support in Longhorn

Microsoft application programming interfaces
Internet Explorer
RSS
Windows components
Windows Vista